Yamaltu/Deba is a Local Government Area of Gombe State, Nigeria. Its headquarters is in the town of Deba (or Deba Habe), at the southeastern part of the state capital Gombe. Its inhabitants are dominantly  Tera and Fulani people. 

The southern part of Lake Dadin Kowa lies within the area.

It has an area of 1,981 km and a population of 255,248 at the 2006 census.

The postal code of the area is 761.

Schools in Deba include 
Asas Primary school of JIBWIS.

Model Primary School, Deba.

Zagaina Primary School.

Government Day Junior Secondary School Deba Central.

Government Comprehensive Secondary School.

GSTC Deba.

Amtas Community Secondary School.

References

Local Government Areas in Gombe State